The Chinese hwamei or melodious laughingthrush (Garrulax canorus) is a passerine bird of eastern Asia in the family Leiothrichidae. The name "hwamei" comes from its Chinese name , which means "painted eyebrow", referring to the distinctive marking around the bird's eyes. The species is a popular cagebird because of its attractive song.

Taxonomy
It has two subspecies: G. c. canorus, native to mainland Asia, and G. c. owstoni of Hainan Island. The Taiwan hwamei (Leucodioptron taewanum) was formerly considered to be a subspecies of the Chinese hwamei but has recently been split as a separate species. Based on a study of the mitochondrial cytochrome b gene, Li et al. (2006) suggested that the two species diverged about 1.5 million years ago with the two Chinese hwamei subspecies diverging about 600,000 years ago. The two were formerly placed in the genus Garrulax with the other laughingthrushes but have recently been moved to a new genus Leucodioptron.

The Chinese hwamei was introduced to Taiwan in large numbers in the 1980s and hybridization with the native Taiwan hwamei is occurring which may threaten the genetic uniqueness of the latter form.

Description

It is 21 to 25 cm long with broad, rounded wings and a fan-shaped tail. The plumage is mostly reddish-brown with dark streaks on the crown, back and throat. There is a white ring around the eye which extends backwards as a white stripe. The bill and feet are yellowish. Birds on Hainan Island (L. c. owstoni) are paler below and more olive-coloured above. The Taiwan hwamei is greyer and more streaked and lacks the white markings on the head.

The song is a loud, clear, varied whistling with regular repetition and imitations of other birds. The call is a rasping whistle or rattle.

Distribution and habitat
The nominate subspecies G. c. canorus occurs across south-eastern and central China and in northern and central Vietnam and Laos. The race G. c. owstoni is found on Hainan.

G. c. canorus has been introduced to Taiwan, Singapore, Japan  and Hawaii. In the Hawaiian Islands it was introduced in the early 20th century and now occurs in both native forest and man-made habitats. It is common on Kauai, Maui and Hawaii Island but less so on Oahu and Molokai.

The bird inhabits scrubland, open woodland, secondary forest, parks and gardens up to 1800 
metres above sea level. It is common in much of its range and is not considered a threatened species.

Behaviour
It is a skulking bird which is often very difficult to see. It typically feeds on the ground among leaf litter, foraging for insects and fruit. It usually occurs in pairs or in small groups.

The breeding season lasts from May to July. A large cup-shaped nest is built up to two metres above the ground in a tree or bush or amongst undergrowth. Two to five blue or blue-green eggs are laid.

References

MacKinnon, John & Phillipps, Karen (2000) A Field Guide to the Birds of China, Oxford University Press, Oxford.
Pratt, H. Douglas; Bruner, Philip L. & Berrett, Delwyn G. (1987), A Field Guide to the Birds of Hawaii and the Tropical Pacific, Princeton University Press, Chichester.
Robson, Craig (2002) A Field Guide to the Birds of South-East Asia, New Holland Publishers (UK) Ltd., London.

External links
Oriental Bird Images - hwamei
 Hwamei videos on the Internet Bird Collection

Chinese hwamei
Birds of China
Birds of Laos
Birds of Singapore
Birds of Japan
Birds of Taiwan
Birds of Vietnam
Chinese hwamei
Chinese hwamei